"This Love Is Real (I Can Feel Those Vibrations)" is a popular song recorded and released by Jackie Wilson in 1970. The single peaked at No. 9 on the Billboard Best Selling Soul Singles chart, and No. 56 on the Hot 100.

References

1970 songs
Jackie Wilson songs
Song articles with missing songwriters